The following is a list of players, both past and current, who appeared at least in one game for the NLEX Road Warriors PBA franchise. Statistics are accurate as of the 2022–23 PBA Commissioner's Cup.

Players

|-
| bgcolor="#FFCC00" align=left|+ || align=left| || G || align=left|Lebanon || 1 ||  || 12 || 211 || 29 || 25 || 28 || 
|-
| align=left| || align=left| || C || align=left| || 2 || – || 33 || 578 || 218 || 110 || 21 || 
|-
| bgcolor="#CFECEC" align=left|^ || align=left| || G || align=left| || 7 || –present || 156 || 4,227 || 1,799 || 629 || 489 || 
|-
| bgcolor="#FFCC00" align=left|+ || align=left| || F || align=left nowrap| || 1 ||  || 11 || 425 || 223 || 154 || 22 || 
|-
| bgcolor="#CFECEC" align=left|^ || align=left| || F || align=left| || 3 || ––present || 50 || 1,478 || 682 || 453 || 118 || 
|-
| align=left| || align=left| || F || align=left| || 2 || – || 26 || 177 || 43 || 39 || 5 || 
|-
| align=left| || align=left| || G/F || align=left| || 2 || – || 36 || 310 || 47 || 55 || 14 || 
|-
| align=left| || align=left| || G || align=left| || 1 ||  || 20 || 157 || 31 || 15 || 9 || 
|-
| bgcolor="#FFCC00" align=left|+ || align=left| || F || align=left| || 2 || – || 12 || 445 || 299 || 163 || 39 || 
|-
| align=left| || align=left| || G || align=left| || 2 || – || 16 || 245 || 61 || 31 || 29 || 
|-
| align=left| || align=left| || G/F || align=left| || 3 || – || 68 || 1,065 || 280 || 153 || 126 || 
|-
| align=left| || align=left| || G || align=left| || 1||  || 17 || 109 || 59 || 14 || 2 || 
|-
| align=left| || align=left| || F || align=left| || 2 || – || 37 || 475 || 141 || 58 || 30 || 
|-
| align=left| || align=left| || F || align=left| || 2 || – || 57 || 1,058 || 253 || 162 || 32 || 
|-
| align=left| || align=left| || G || align=left| || 1 ||  || 7 || 76 || 23 || 10 || 5 || 
|-
| align=left| || align=left| || F || align=left| || 3 || – || 46 || 413 || 170 || 115 || 21 || 
|-
| align=left| || align=left| || F || align=left| || 1 ||  || 36 || 721 || 291 || 120 || 20 ||
|-
| align=left| || align=left| || G || align=left| || 2 || – || 50 || 1,066 || 451 || 191 || 61 || 
|-
| bgcolor="#CFECEC" align=left|^ || align=left| || G || align=left| || 1 || –present || 6 || 71 || 12 || 6 || 8 || 
|-
| bgcolor="#FFCC00" align=left|+ || align=left nowrap| || F/C || align=left| || 1 ||  || 11 || 412 || 259 || 159 || 28 || 
|-
| align=left| || align=left| || F/C || align=left| || 2 || 2022,  || 33 || 638 || 317 || 162 || 31 || 
|-
| bgcolor="#FFCC00" align=left|+ || align=left| || F ||align=left| || 1 || 2022 || 6 || 236 || 149 || 71 || 10 || 
|-
| bgcolor="#FFCC00" align=left|+ || align=left| || F || align=left| || 1 ||  || 13 || 542 || 420 || 207 || 52 || 
|-
| align=left| || align=left| || G || align=left| || 3 || –2022 || 52 || 1,328 || 558 || 184 || 183 || 
|-
| bgcolor="#CFECEC" align=left|^ || align=left| || G || align=left| || 1 || nowrap|–present ||  ||  ||  ||  ||  || 
|-
| align=left| || align=left| || G || align=left| || 1 ||  || 24 || 550 || 150 || 43 || 53 || 
|-
| align=left| || align=left| || C || align=left| || 1 ||  || 33 || 850 || 386 || 269 || 59 || 
|-
| align=left| || align=left| || G/F || align=left| || 4 || – || 84 || 1,814 || 606 || 251 || 171 || 
|-
| bgcolor="#FFCC00" align=left|+ || align=left| || C || align=left| || 1 ||  || 1 || 41 || 26 || 17 || 1 || 
|-
| align=left| || align=left| || G/F || align=left| || 1 ||  || 3 || 18 || 3 || 0 || 0 || 
|-
| bgcolor="#FFCC00" align=left|+ || align=left| || F || align=left| || 2 || – || 21 || 841 || 562 || 364 || 62 || 
|-
| bgcolor="#cfecec" align=left|^ || align=left| || G || align=left| || 1 || –present || || || || || || 
|-
| align=left| || align=left| || G/F || align=left| || 4 || –2022 || 55 || 1,009 || 381 || 97 || 66 || 
|-
| bgcolor="#cfecec" align=left nowrap|^ || align=left| || F/C || align=left| || 1 || –present || 11 || 292 || 122 || 57 || 10 || 
|-
| align=left| || align=left| || C/F || align=left| || 2 || – || 28 || 205 || 52 || 47 || 11 || 
|-
| align=left| || align=left| || C/F || align=left| || 1 ||  || 19 || 368 || 127 || 92 || 15 || 
|-
| bgcolor="#FFCC00" align=left|+ || align=left| || G || align=left| || 1 ||  || 8 || 320 || 247 || 72 || 52 || 
|-
| align=left| || align=left| || G || align=left| || 1 ||  || 7 || 51 || 12 || 7 || 3 || 
|-
| bgcolor="#cfecec" align=left|^ || align=left| || F || align=left| || 6 || –present || 123 || 1,878 || 602 || 333 || 92 || 
|-
| align=left| || align=left| || F || align=left| || 2 ||– || 53 || 773 || 212 || 93 || 34 || 
|-
| align=left| || align=left| || G || align=left| || 2 || – || 49 || 896 || 344 || 77 || 45 || 
|-
| align=left| || align=left| || G || align=left| || 1 ||  || 22 || 204 || 61 || 29 || 27 || 
|-
| align=left| || align=left| || G || align=left| || 1 ||  || 33 || 543 || 280 || 45 || 56 || 
|-
| align=left| || align=left| || G || align=left| || 1 ||  || 25 || 409 || 114 || 43 || 34 || 
|-
| bgcolor="#FFCC00" align=left|+ || align=left| || G/F || align=left|Syria || 1 ||  || 10 || 304 || 197 || 30 || 24 || 
|-
| bgcolor="#cfecec" align=left|^ || align=left| || F/C || align=left| || 3 || –present || 32 || 397 || 119 || 120 || 17 || 
|-
| align=left| || align=left| || G/F || align=left| || 2 || – || 47 || 1,098 || 434 || 219 || 136 || 
|-
| align=left| || align=left| || F/C || align=left| || 1 ||  || 14 || 151 || 32 || 32 || 9 || 
|-
| align=left| || align=left| || F/C || align=left| || 2 || – || 14 || 157 || 57 || 47 || 3 || 
|-
| bgcolor="#FFCC00" align=left|+ || align=left| || G/F || align=left| || 1 || 2021–2022 || 11 || 437 || 334 || 126 || 36 || 
|-
| bgcolor="#cfecec" align=left|^ || align=left| || F/C || align=left| || 5 || –present || 101 || 1,772 || 499 || 349 || 87 || 
|-
| bgcolor="#FFCC00" align=left|+ || align=left| || F || align=left| || 1 ||  || 6 || 216 || 164 || 76 || 16 || 
|-
| align=left| || align=left| || G || align=left| || 4 || – || 58 || 718 || 169 || 105 || 94 || 
|-
| bgcolor="#FFCC00" align=left|+ || align=left| || F || align=left| || 1 ||  || 9 || 342 || 269 || 132 || 30 || 
|-
| align=left| || align=left| || F || align=left| || 1 || 2022 || 4 || 34 || 13 || 10 || 0 || 
|-
| bgcolor="#cfecec" align=left|^ || align=left| || G || align=left| || 2 || 2022–present || 27 || 724 || 194 || 61 || 88 || 
|-
| align=left| || align=left| || F || align=left| || 2 || – || 33 || 881 || 435 || 222 || 71 || 
|-
| bgcolor="#cfecec" align=left|^ || align=left| || G || align=left| || 5 || –present || 94 || 1,406 || 537 || 187 || 154 || 
|-
| align=left| || align=left| || F/C || align=left| || 1 ||  || 11 || 93 || 11 || 19 || 2 || 
|-
| align=left| || align=left| || F || align=left| || 1 || –present || || || || || || 
|-
| align=left| || align=left| || F/C || align=left| || 3 || –2022 || 30 || 531 || 147 || 86 || 25 || 
|-
| bgcolor="#cfecec" align=left|^ || align=left| || F/C || align=left| || 6 || –present || 138 || 3,609 || 1,561 || 652 || 321 || 
|-
| align=left| || align=left| || F || align=left| || 1 ||  || 36 || 711 || 221 || 116 || 14 || 
|-
| align=left| || align=left| || G || align=left| || 4 || – || 51 || 1,541 || 846 || 221 || 301 || 
|-
| align=left| || align=left| || G || align=left| || 1 ||  || 24 || 184 || 43 || 25 || 21 || 
|-
| align=left| || align=left| || F/C || align=left| || 1 ||  || 27 || 228 || 49 || 54 || 3 || 
|-
| align=left| || align=left| || G/F || align=left| || 4 || – || 65 || 738 || 245 || 120 || 72 || 
|-
| bgcolor="#cfecec" align=left|^ || align=left| || G || align=left| || 2 || –present || 39 || 829 || 283 || 92 || 80 || 
|-
| bgcolor="#FFCC00" align=left|+ || align=left| || F || align=left| || 1 ||  ||  ||  ||  ||  || || 
|-
| bgcolor="#cfecec" align=left|^ || align=left| || F || align=left| || 3 || –present || 46 || 1,008 || 286 || 148 || 25 || 
|-
| bgcolor="#FFCC00" align=left|+ || align=left| || G/F || align=left| || 1 ||  || 4 || 170 || 148 || 36 || 20 || 
|-
| align=left| || align=left| || C || align=left| || 8 || – || 144 || 1,842 || 729 || 589 || 66 || 
|-
| align=left| || align=left| || G || align=left| || 2 || – || 30 || 495 || 160 || 53 || 88 || 
|-
| bgcolor="#cfecec" align=left|^ || align=left| || C || align=left| || 8 || –present || 157 || 3,023 || 1,227 || 947 || 194 || 
|-
| bgcolor="#FFCC00" align=left|+ || align=left| || F || align=left| || 2 || – || 25 || 1,054 || 833 || 303 || 51 || 
|-
| align=left| || align=left| || G || align=left| || 3 || – || 83 || 1,341 || 515 || 145 || 197 || 
|-
| bgcolor="#cfecec" align=left|^ || align=left| || G/F || align=left| || 2 || –present || 54 || 1,644 || 718 || 306 || 109 || 
|-
| align=left| || align=left| || G || align=left| || 1 ||  || 10 || 139 || 23 || 22 || 23 || 
|-
| align=left| || align=left| || G/F || align=left| || 4 || – || 59 || 802 || 124 || 89 || 42 || 
|-
| align=left| || align=left| || F/C || align=left| || 4 || – || 74 || 1,208 || 339 || 201 || 58 || 
|-
| align=left| || align=left| || G || align=left| || 4 || – || 100 || 2,583 || 782 || 285 || 311 || 
|-
| bgcolor="#FFCC00" align=left|+ || align=left| || G/F || align=left| || 1 ||  || 12 || 508 || 385 || 134 || 33 || 
|-
| bgcolor="#FFCC00" align=left|+ || align=left| || F/C || align=left| || 1 ||  || 1 || 32 || 18 || 16 || 1 || 
|-
| align=left| || align=left| || G || align=left| || 2 || – || 9 || 137 || 41 || 18 || 18 || 
|}

References